Schwinkendorf is a former municipality  in the Mecklenburgische Seenplatte district, in Mecklenburg-Vorpommern, Germany. Since 1 January 2013, it is part of the municipality Moltzow.

References

Former municipalities in Mecklenburg-Western Pomerania